William McCormack (5 May 1877 – 26 April 1946) was an Australian cricketer. He played two first-class cricket matches for Victoria between 1901 and 1902.

See also
 List of Victoria first-class cricketers

References

External links
 

1877 births
1946 deaths
Australian cricketers
Victoria cricketers
Cricketers from Melbourne